Romain Ghanem Paul Saïss (born 26 March 1990) is a professional footballer who plays as a centre-back for Süper Lig club Beşiktaş and captains the Morocco national team.

Saïss began his career with Valence, then played for Le Havre and Clermont of Ligue 2, and Angers of Ligue 1 before joining Wolverhampton Wanderers in 2016. He made 206 appearances and scored 15 goals, before moving to Beşiktaş in 2021.

Born in France to a Moroccan father and French mother, Saïss represents Morocco at international level. A full international since 2012, he has earned over 70 caps for Morocco, becoming the team's captain in 2019. He has represented the nation at three Africa Cup of Nations tournaments and two FIFA World Cups, helping the team come fourth at the 2022 edition of the latter.

Club career

Early career
Saïss began his senior career with Valence in the Championnat de France Amateur 2 (fifth-tier), and supplemented his €500 monthly salary with washing up at his parents' restaurant. At 21, he signed his first professional contract with Clermont in Ligue 2.

In June 2013, Saïss moved across Ligue 2 to Le Havre on a two year deal. When it ended, he joined Ligue 1 side Angers on a two-year contract.

Wolverhampton Wanderers
On 30 August 2016, Saïss moved to England, joining EFL Championship club Wolverhampton Wanderers for an undisclosed fee on a four-year deal. He made his debut on 17 September in a 2–0 win at Newcastle United. In the game, he was subjected to racial abuse by opponent Jonjo Shelvey, who was given a five-match ban and £100,000 fine by The FA in December.

He scored his first goal for the club on 30 September 2017 in a 4–0 win against Burton Albion.

Following Wolves' promotion to the Premier League in 2018, Saïss made his debut Premier League appearance as a substitute in a 1–1 draw with Manchester United at Old Trafford on 22 September 2018. His first start in the Premier League came in a 2–1 defeat away to Cardiff City at the Cardiff City Stadium on 30 November. He scored his first Premier League goal in a 1–1 draw with Fulham at Craven Cottage on 26 December 2018. On 21 February 2019 he agreed a new contract until the summer of 2021.

On 25 July 2019 Saïss made his debut appearance in UEFA European club football competition as a late substitute in Wolves's 2–0 home win against Crusaders in the 2019–20 UEFA Europa League Second Qualifying Round and on 24 October he scored his first goal in such a competition when he scored the opening goal of a 2–1 away win at Slovan Bratislava in the 2019–20 UEFA Europa League group stage.

Saïss triggered an automatic one-year extension to his contract on 18 March 2021, by making 20 starts in the Premier League during the 2020–21 season, tying him to the club until June 2022. He was described as the Moroccan Maldini by head coach Bruno Lage on 15 December that year, after his display in the away Premier League tie at Brighton & Hove Albion, where he scored the only goal in a much longed-for win (Wolves's first-ever win at Brighton in the top-flight in seven attempts dating back to 1979). He made his 100th appearance in the Premier League in 2–0 win away to Tottenham Hotspur on 13 February 2022. His 200th competitive appearance in all competitions for Wolves was on 5 March 2022 in a home fixture against Crystal Palace.

On 31 May 2022, Saïss announced that he would leave Wolves at the end of his contract on 1 July, having played 206 games for the club over six seasons, and scoring 15 goals, nine of them in the Premier League.

Beşiktaş
On 14 June 2022, Saïss moved to Turkey, joining Süper Lig club Beşiktaş. He made his debut on 6 August as the season began with a 1–0 home win over Kayserispor.

International career

Saïss, who was born and raised in France to a Moroccan father and a French mother, chose to represent the Morocco national team. He made his debut in a 1–0 friendly loss to Togo in November 2012.

Saïss was in the Moroccan squad that reached the quarter-finals of the 2017 Africa Cup of Nations in Gabon. He scored his first international goal in their 3–1 group win over Togo. In June 2018, he was named in Morocco's 23-man squad for the 2018 FIFA World Cup in Russia, and featured in group games against Iran and Spain. After the 2019 Africa Cup of Nations, in which Morocco made the last 16, Saïss became the captain of the Atlas Lions.

On 10 November 2022, Saïss was named in Morocco's 26-man squad for the 2022 FIFA World Cup in Qatar. He scored the opening goal of a 2–0 group stage victory over Belgium on 27 November, Morocco's first goal of the tournament. The goal had previously been awarded to Abdelhamid Sabiri, but Saïss was later credited for the goal by FIFA. In the semi-final against France – the first ever played by an African nation – he was substituted after 21 minutes due to injury as Morocco lost 2–0.

Personal life
Saïss's father is Moroccan and his mother is French, both restaurant owners. He is a Muslim and observes fasting in the month of Ramadan.

Career statistics

Club

International

Scores and results list Morocco's goal tally first, score column indicates score after each Saïss goal.

Honours
Wolverhampton Wanderers
EFL Championship: 2017–18
Morocco
FIFA World Cup fourth place: 2022
Individual
 Angers Player of the Season: 2015–16
IFFHS Africa Team of The Year: 2022

References

External links

1990 births
Living people
Citizens of Morocco through descent
Moroccan footballers
Morocco international footballers
French footballers
Footballers from Auvergne-Rhône-Alpes
Sportspeople from Drôme
Association football defenders
Ligue 1 players
Championnat National 3 players
Olympique de Valence players
Clermont Foot players
Le Havre AC players
Angers SCO players
Wolverhampton Wanderers F.C. players
Beşiktaş J.K. footballers
English Football League players
Premier League players
Ligue 2 players
Süper Lig players
French sportspeople of Moroccan descent
Moroccan people of French descent
Moroccan expatriate footballers
French expatriate footballers
Expatriate footballers in England
Expatriate footballers in Turkey
French expatriate sportspeople in England
French expatriate sportspeople in Turkey
Moroccan expatriate sportspeople in England
Moroccan expatriate sportspeople in Turkey
2017 Africa Cup of Nations players
2018 FIFA World Cup players
2019 Africa Cup of Nations players
2021 Africa Cup of Nations players
2022 FIFA World Cup players
French Muslims
Moroccan Muslims